Cavalry Barracks  is a railway station in Hyderabad, Telangana, India located on the Manmad–Secunderabad section of the South Central Railway. The Cantonment area is accessible from this station.

Lines
Hyderabad Multi-Modal Transport System
Secunderabad–Bolarum route (SB Line)

External links
MMTS Timings as per South Central Railway
A blue YP departs Cavalry Barracks with an afternoon Secunderabad-Bolarum suburban train. Cavalry Barracks, 1984-01-04 : Photo Credit John Lacey. 
YP#2225 departs Cavalry Barracks in the Hyderabad suburban area with long distance #581 Ajmer-Kacheguda Fast Pass. Cavalry Barracks, 1984-01-03. Photo Credit John Lacey. 
A YP is working hard as it hauls a heavy load ( 13 bogies) on the 1 in 133 grade climbing north on #582 Kacheguda-Ajmer Fast Pass. Cavalry Barracks, 1984-01-03 Photo Credit John Lacey 

MMTS stations in Hyderabad
Hyderabad railway division